Matthias Moosdorf (born 1965) is a German cellist and politician (Alternative für Deutschland).

Life

Music 
Born in Leipzig, Moosdorf is the son of the Leipzig violinist Otto-Georg Moosdorf. In 1991, he passed the Konzertexamen and was an assistant at the Leipzig University of Music until 1996, where he subsequently held a teaching position for violoncello and chamber music until 2006.

Moosdorf was a member of the Leipzig String Quartet from 1988 to 2019, with whom he recorded over 120 CDs and gave guest performances in 60 countries. At the same time, he was principal cellist at the Leipzig Chamber Orchestra from 1991 to 2001. From 2006 to 2014, he played in the "Ex Aequo" trio with Gerald Fauth (piano) and Matthias Wollong (violin), and since 2007 in the Ecco (!) Trio with Olga Gollej (piano) and Karl Leister (clarinet). Until 2018, he was artistic director of the music series "Musique aux Salles de Pologne". He plays on a cello by Andrea Guarneri from 1697.

Politics 
In September 2016, Moosdorf joined the Alternative for Germany party. Within the party, he was initially considered a close confidant of party leader Frauke Petry and her husband Marcus Pretzell, at whose wedding celebration he took part in December 2016. He wrote texts for Petry's blog "Der Blaue Kanal" and acted as an advisor to the AfD parliamentary group in the Saxon state parliament. In March 2017, music critic Arno Lücker reported critically on Moosdorf's political engagement and statements, which Lücker characterised as right-wing populism, in the music blog of the Neue Musikzeitung. After a rift with Petry and Pretzell, Moosdorf turned to the right wing of the party. 

Together with  he campaigned for the establishment of a party-affiliated foundation of the AfD under the name "Gustav-Stresemann-Stiftung". Since around January 2018, Moosdorf has been a research assistant to the Bavarian AfD member of the Bundestag Martin Hebner. He was one of the first signatories of the Erklärung 2018 against "illegal mass immigration". In August 2018, in a blog commentary, he accused the former pastor of Leipzig's Thomaskirche,  he had "brought on the way from the unspeakable pulpit" that now "[e]very day" doctors were "murdered early in their office hours [...] by migrants" and girls were "raped and killed". A criminal complaint by Wolff against Moosdorf for defamation was not pursued by the Leipzig public prosecutor's office. According to reports by the RedaktionsNetzwerk Deutschland and Die Zeit in November 2018, Moosdorf was the main person responsible for the AfD campaign against the Global Compact for Migration.

Publication 
 Ludwig van Beethoven. Die Streichquartette. Bärenreiter 2007,

References

External links 
 
 

German classical cellists
Alternative for Germany politicians
1965 births
Living people
Musicians from Leipzig
Members of the Bundestag 2021–2025